Oana Manuela Pantelimon, née Musunoiu (born 27 September 1972 in Tecuci) is a Romanian high jumper.

At the 2000 Olympic Games Pantelimon ended in third place, tied with Kajsa Bergqvist of Sweden. As the two athletes had an identical jumping record, with perfect attempts up to 1.99 where both had one foul, they shared the bronze medal. Pantelimon, who had no international honors before this competition, even jumped a personal best of 1.99 metres, improving her old mark with 5 centimetres.

Pantelimon has not been able to win any titles since the 2000 Olympics. She finished ninth at the 2001 World Championships, eighth at the 2002 European Indoor Championships, fourth at the 2002 European Championships, ninth at the 2003 World Indoor Championships, seventh at the 2004 Olympic Games and ninth at the 2005 European Indoor Championships. She also competed at the World Championships in 2003 and 2005 without qualifying for the final round. A 1.95 m jump from 2005 has been her best mark since the 2000 season.

References

External links 
 

1972 births
Living people
Romanian female high jumpers
Athletes (track and field) at the 1992 Summer Olympics
Athletes (track and field) at the 2000 Summer Olympics
Athletes (track and field) at the 2004 Summer Olympics
Olympic athletes of Romania
People from Tecuci
Medalists at the 2000 Summer Olympics
Olympic bronze medalists for Romania
Olympic bronze medalists in athletics (track and field)